Mustilizans andracoides is a moth in the Endromidae family. It was described by Vadim V. Zolotuhin in 2007. It is found in Yunnan, China.

References

Moths described in 2007
Mustilizans